"The Delivery" is a two-part episode of the sixth season of the American comedy series The Office. Since it is an hour-long episode, it is considered to be the 17th and 18th episodes in the season's episode count. It is the 117th and 118th episode overall.

In this episode, Pam starts having contractions but insists on waiting till midnight to go to the hospital in order to get an extra night at the hospital, irritating Jim. The office tries to distract her with food and entertainment. She eventually goes to the hospital and gives birth to a daughter, Cecelia Marie Halpert. Meanwhile, Michael, inspired by the success of Pam and Jim's relationship, sets up Erin with Kevin. Dwight, sent over to find Pam's iPod, discovers mold in Pam and Jim's house and remodels their entire kitchen, and also considers entering a pre-natal contract with ex-girlfriend Angela, for he feels he needs a baby for business reasons.

Part one is written by Daniel Chun and directed by Seth Gordon, while part two is written by Charlie Grandy and directed by Harold Ramis. The episode received mixed reviews from critics and came first in its time slot, helping NBC be the third highest-rated network of the night.

Plot
Pam Halpert (Jenna Fischer) and Jim Halpert (John Krasinski) both acquire sales while making small talk about their baby's upcoming birth. Dwight Schrute (Rainn Wilson) wants to do the same and asks Angela Martin (Angela Kinsey) to have a baby with him. Angela is initially excited, but becomes annoyed after Dwight makes a parenting contract with absurd demands he wants her to agree to.

Michael Scott (Steve Carell) anxiously waits for Pam and Jim's baby to be born; Jim urges Pam to let him take her to the hospital, but Pam would rather wait until midnight like she and Jim wanted to do initially (arriving after midnight means a longer hospital stay under the terms of their health insurance). She finds comfort in watching the rest of the office performing absurd activities to distract her from the pain. When Jim reaches his breaking point, Pam reveals that their baby is a girl, which calms Jim's nerves a bit, but then she tells him that her water broke.

Since Pam and Kevin Malone (Brian Baumgartner) have gotten hungry at the same times, they have enjoyed regular meals together, and Kevin prepares her one final "Ultra Feast" before she gives birth. When the contractions appear to become too extreme, Jim, Michael, and Kevin all think it is time for her to go to the hospital. Pam still refuses, and finally breaks down admitting that she is scared to give birth. Jim initially assures her that everything will be all right, but goes into a panic when he's informed she is now at 2 minutes in between contractions (5–7 minutes is the suggested time to leave for the hospital). Pam finally relents and Michael drives her and Jim to the hospital, with Dwight "escorting" them. Pam realizes she has forgotten her iPod with her desired birth music on it so they request that Dwight retrieve it from their house, asking that he not "touch anything". After 19 hours of labor, Cecelia Marie Halpert is born at 1:21 pm, weighing in at 7 lbs 2oz.

Pam's breastfeeding does not go well, and though a male lactation consultant (Lee Kirk, Fischer's real-life husband) is summoned to provide apparently successful coaching, Cecelia still fails to "latch" properly. Against the advice of the nurse, Jim and Pam opt to have Cecelia spend the night with them instead of in the nursery, and they are kept up long hours tending to her. A sleep-deprived Pam accidentally nurses a baby that belongs to a new mom (Melissa Rauch) in the same hospital room. As Jim and Pam get ready to leave the hospital, Pam manages to breast feed Cecelia while Jim gets the car (which is littered with parking tickets, thanks to Michael parking the car in an ambulance only zone).

Michael sees the birth as proof that he is a successful office matchmaker. He sets up Kevin on a lunch date with Erin Hannon (Ellie Kemper), making Andy Bernard (Ed Helms) jealous. Though Kevin thinks the lunch goes well, Michael rudely tells Kevin that he is not good enough to date Erin, infuriating and confusing Kevin as Michael told Kevin that Erin liked him. Kevin also points out that Michael has dated women that appeared to be better than him. Eventually, Andy finally considers actually asking Erin out himself, to which she happily accepts as Michael looks on.

At the Halpert residence, Dwight embarks on a search for the iPod only to find mold under the sink and moves in for several days while he reconstructs the cabinets. Dwight and Angela make the final revisions to the parenting contract, but Dwight begins to have second thoughts after an encounter with Pam's friend Isabel (Kelen Coleman), with whom he had a one night stand at Jim and Pam's wedding. He signs the contract, but decides to hold it off. Jim and Pam arrive home with the baby and find Dwight and their wrecked house, but decide not to question it.

Production
The first part of the episode was written by Daniel Chun, his second writing credit for the series after "Murder", and directed by Seth Gordon, his second directing credit for the series after "Double Date". The second part was written by Charlie Grandy, his fourth writing credit of the series, and directed by Harold Ramis, who also directed "A Benihana Christmas," "Safety Training" and "Beach Games." The episode also guest stars Nelson Franklin playing Nick the IT Administrator who would appear in later episodes, and Linda Purl who played Helene, Pam's mother who previously dated Michael. While the episode has a failed attempt at pairing Kevin and Erin, actor Brian Baumgartner revealed he actually pitched to the writers them becoming a couple for considering "their energies matched in a weird way", and also to let Kevin "mature a little bit".

Reception

In its original American broadcast, part one of "The Delivery" was watched by 8.71 million viewers, with a 4.5 rating and a 12 share in the 18–49 demographic, with part two increasing in viewers to 9.35 million and a 4.9 rating and a 13 share winning its timeslot both times and helping NBC come third ahead of ABC and The CW. The episode ranked 10th in the weekly 18–49 ratings and ranked 24th in total viewers weekly ratings. It was the last episode of The Office to be viewed by over 9 million viewers.
  
Dan Phillips of IGN gave the episode a 6.6 saying that Pam's lactation problems and Kevin's lack of personality while dating Erin made consistently amusing plots, "But sadly everything that the episode's half-hour gets right doesn't make up for the painfully uncomfortable and largely unfunny first half." He particularly objected to the length that Pam's refusal to go to the hospital is stretched out, since the entire office supporting her irrational decision even after her water breaks was "uncomfortable and unbelievable". Ken Tucker of Entertainment Weekly gave the episode a positive review saying "Last night managed to combine a thoroughly believable and funny central idea—that Pam would try to delay going to the hospital to get some extra time, gaming the office’s “stupid HMO”—with a batch of fine Michael scenes and a thoroughly didn’t-buy-it-for-a-second Dwight subplot." Nathan Rabin of The A.V. Club gave the episode a B+ saying "It felt a little padded and implausible and lurched from one radically different tone to another but it was also very funny and intriguingly prickly and real when it wasn't being cartoonish and over the top. It wasn't a home run."

Joel Keller of TV Squad gave the episode a mixed review saying "As usual with most one-hour 'Office' episodes, the first half was better than the second. But even the first half of this one had some problems".

References

External links
 "The Delivery" at NBC.com
 
 

2010 American television episodes
The Office (American season 6) episodes
The Office (American TV series) episodes in multiple parts